Charlon Gouder is a Maltese journalist with the network One.

External links 
Charlon Gouder asks police to investigate Caruana Galizia (Times of Malta)
Court: Charlon Gouder asks police to investigate DCG (The Malta Independent Online)
YouTube
 https://www.timesofmalta.com/mobile/articles/view/20120611/local/caruana-galizia-cleared-in-gouder-libel-case.423796

Maltese journalists
Living people
Year of birth missing (living people)